Lidiya Gusheva (born 11 February 1952) is a Bulgarian athlete. She competed in the women's long jump at the 1980 Summer Olympics.

References

External links
 

1952 births
Living people
Athletes (track and field) at the 1980 Summer Olympics
Bulgarian female long jumpers
Olympic athletes of Bulgaria
Place of birth missing (living people)